is a 2007 Japanese film directed by Takeo Kimura and starring Yamaguchi Sayoko and Seijun Suzuki. It is abstract and focused around the atomic bombing of Nagasaki.

Cast 

 Mitsuru Chiak ...Yohane
 Seijun Suzuki
 Sayoko Yamaguchi

References

External links
 Official website 

2007 films
2000s Japanese-language films
Japanese avant-garde and experimental films
Films about the atomic bombings of Hiroshima and Nagasaki
2000s Japanese films